4192: The Crowning of the Hit King is a 2010 documentary film that follows the exploits and achievements of Pete Rose, a baseball player. The film, directed by Terry Lukemire, is narrated by J. K. Simmons. The film stars Marty Brennaman, Tony Pérez, Mike Schmidt, and Pete Rose himself, who relay the struggle and effort it took to make history through America's favorite pastime.

Synopsis 
On the evening of September 11, 1985, before a sellout crowd at Riverfront Stadium in Cincinnati, Pete Rose stood on the edge of history. With one swing he would collect more hits than anyone in the history of the game he loved. 4192: The Crowning of the Hit King is a love letter to baseball that highlights the playing career of one of the game's most honored and controversial stars. It is a story that began in 1963 when Rose ran to first base on a walk. It spanned more than two decades and brought numerous individual awards as well as three World Series titles. But there is more to this story than just awards. It is about baseball and what drove this man to chase what many thought was an unbreakable record and become "The Hit King."

Cast 
 Pete Rose - As Himself
 Marty Brennaman - As Himself
 Tony Pérez - As Himself
 Mike Schmidt - As Himself
 J.K. Simmons - Narrator

References

External links
 
 

American sports documentary films
2010 films
Biographical films about sportspeople
Documentary films about baseball
American baseball films
Cultural depictions of baseball players
Cultural depictions of American men
2010s English-language films
2010 documentary films
2010s American films